Harpalus salinus is a species of ground beetle native to Europe, where it can be found in Ukraine and southern part of Russia. It is also found in such Asian countries as Afghanistan, Kazakhstan, Kyrgyzstan, Tajikistan, Indian province Kashmir, and Chinese ones such as Xinjiang, Xizang and  Tibet.

Subspecies
It has 3 subspecies:
Harpalus salinus agonus Tschitscherine, 1894
Harpalus salinus klementzae Kataev, 1984
Harpalus salinus salinus

References

salinus
Beetles of Asia
Beetles of Europe
Beetles described in 1829